Ficus lacunata is a species of plant in the family Moraceae which is endemic to Ecuador.  F. lacunata is a free-standing tree which grows up to 25 m (82 ft) tall in wet forests in the Andes.

Ficus lacunata is member of the subgenus Pharmacosycea.  Members of this subgenus are free-standing trees.  Most members of the other main Neotropical subgenus, Urostigma begin life as hemiepiphytes.

It grows in pluvial montane forest on the western slope of the Andes, 1800 to 2200 m (5900 to 6600 mft) above sea level.  It has been classified as a Vulnerable species based on the fact that it is known from only three locations.

Description
Ficus lacunata trees grow up to 25 m (82 ft) tall.  Its leaves range from roughly oval in shape to more narrow with a leathery texture.  They range in length from 15 to 21 cm (6–8 in) and in width from 7–10.5 cm (3–4 in).  The figs are borne singly on a short petiole up to 1.1 cm (0.4 in) long  and are 2–2.9 cm (0.8–1.1 in) in diameter.

References

lacunata
Endemic flora of Ecuador
Trees of Ecuador
Plants described in 1997
Taxonomy articles created by Polbot